The Roman Catholic Diocese of Ngozi is a diocese located in the city of Ngozi in the Ecclesiastical province of Gitega in Burundi.

History
 July 14, 1949: Established as Apostolic Vicariate of Ngozi from the Apostolic Vicariate of Urundi
 November 10, 1959: Promoted as Diocese of Ngozi

Special churches
The Cathedral is the Our Lady of Fatima Cathedral in Ngozi.

Bishops

Ordinaries, in reverse chronological order
 Bishops of Ngozi (Roman rite), below
 Bishop Georges Bizimana (since December 17, 2019)
 Bishop Gervais Banshimiyubusa (December 14, 2002  – March 24, 2018), appointed Archbishop of Bujumbura
 Bishop Stanislas Kaburungu (September 5, 1968  – December 14, 2002)
 Bishop André Makarakiza, M. Afr. (August 21, 1961  – September 5, 1968), appointed Archbishop of Gitega
 Bishop Joseph Martin, M. Afr. (November 10, 1959  – June 6, 1961); see below
 Vicar Apostolic of Ngozi (Roman rite), below
 Bishop Joseph Martin, M. Afr. (July 14, 1949  – November 10, 1959); see above

Coadjutor bishop
Gervais Banshimiyubusa (2000-2002)

See also
Roman Catholicism in Burundi

References

External links
 GCatholic.org
 Catholic Hierarchy 

Ngozi
Ngozi
Christian organizations established in 1949
Roman Catholic dioceses and prelatures established in the 20th century
1949 establishments in Ruanda-Urundi